General elections were held in Romania on 27 September 1992, with a second round of the presidential election on 11 October. They were the first held after the adoption of a permanent constitution via a referendum held the previous winter.

Incumbent Ion Iliescu led the field in the first round, but was forced into a runoff with Emil Constantinescu, candidate of the oppositional Romanian Democratic Convention (CDR). Constantinescu ran on a quicker transition to a market economy and purging remaining Communist influence from the government. He benefited from a marked downturn in Iliescu's popularity tied to both high unemployment and concerns that Iliescu was wavering in his commitment to democracy.

Despite this, opinion polls ahead of the runoff suggested that Iliescu was favoured for a second full term. Not only was it believed that his 16-point first-round lead was too large for Constantinescu to overcome, but most of the minor candidates were expected to throw their support to Iliescu. In the end, Iliescu was reelected with 61 percent of the vote.

In the parliamentary election, Iliescu's Democratic National Salvation Front (FDSN), which had split off from the National Salvation Front (FSN) earlier in the year, emerged as the largest party in Parliament, winning 117 of the 341 seats in the Chamber of Deputies and 49 of the 143 seats in the Senate.

Presidential candidates

Participating candidates

Withdrawn candidates

Results

President

Gheorghe Funar and Ioan Mânzatu openly endorsed Ion Iliescu in the second round.

Parliament

Senate

Chamber of Deputies

References

Parliamentary elections in Romania
Presidential elections in Romania
Romania
General
Romania
Romania